The 1989 Fiji rugby union tour of Oceania was a series of matches played in Australia, New Zealand, Samoa and Tonga, between April and June 1989 in  by Fiji national rugby union team.

In reality there were three different tours. In April in Australia, then in New Zealand (no test match) and in June–July in Samoa and Tonga.

Results

Australia

Against Wellington at Suva

In New Zealand

In Samoa

Against Tonga in Suva

Against Tonga in Nukuʻalofa 

Fiji
tour
Fiji national rugby union team tours
tour
tour
tour
Rugby union tours of Samoa
Rugby union tours of Tonga
Rugby union tours of Australia
Rugby union tours of New Zealand
1989 in Oceanian rugby union